General elections were held in Tonga in 1951

Electoral system
The Legislative Assembly had seven directly-elected members; three representing Tongatapu and nearby islands, two representing Haʻapai and two representing Vavaʻu and nearby islands. A further seven members were elected by the nobility based on the same constituencies, seven ministers (including the governors of Haʻapai and Vavaʻu) and a Speaker chosen by the monarch, Sālote Tupou III.

Results
Elected members included the commoners Molitoni Finau and Sekonaia Tu'akoi and the noble Semisi Fonua from Tongatapu.

References

1951 in Tonga
Tonga
Elections in Tonga